The 2016–17 Ottawa Senators season was the 25th season of the Ottawa Senators of the National Hockey League (NHL). After failing to make the 2016 Stanley Cup playoffs, the Senators replaced their management and coaching staff, promoting Pierre Dorion to general manager, and hiring Guy Boucher and Marc Crawford and assistants to coach the team. The team would defy the predictions of much of the media by qualifying for the 2017 playoffs, and then by winning two rounds in the playoffs before losing in double overtime in game seven of the Eastern Conference Final to the eventual Stanley Cup champion Pittsburgh Penguins.

As of 2021, this is the only time in the post-Daniel Alfredsson era where the Senators have come close to playing in the Stanley Cup Final. It would have been their first appearance in the Final since 2007. Coincidentally they were close to a rematch with the Anaheim Ducks, whom they lost to in the 2007 Final.

The season was notable for off-ice issues. Despite the success of the team, attendance at Canadian Tire Centre dropped during the regular season, to the lowest average gate by the team in 20 seasons. The team fired its head of marketing early in the season. The team also replaced its president, co-founder Cyril Leeder, with Tom Anselmi in January 2017.

Off-season
On April 10, 2016, the day after the final game of the 2015–16 season, general manager Bryan Murray announced his resignation as manager and that he would continue in an advisory role with the club. Assistant general manager Pierre Dorion was elevated to the general manager position. On April 12, the Senators fired head coach Dave Cameron. On May 8, the Senators hired former Tampa Bay Lightning head coach Guy Boucher as their new head coach. On the following day, Marc Crawford was announced as associate coach. On June 15, the Senators hired Rob Cookson as an assistant coach. Cookson had spent the last four seasons as an assistant to Crawford with ZSC Lions of Switzerland's National League A, with whom he contributed to the team's championship in the 2013–14 season. Prior to this, he was a member of the Calgary Flames coaching staff for 11 seasons from the 2000–01 to 2010–11 seasons.

The Senators announced the retirement of the #11 jersey of former team captain Daniel Alfredsson. The ceremony took place on  December 29, prior to the Senators' home game against the Detroit Red Wings. This is the second jersey to be retired by the current Senators franchise since they came back into the league. The first jersey retirement ceremony the club held was for the late Frank Finnigan of the original Ottawa Senators, who had his #8 jersey retired prior to the current franchise's inaugural game on October 8, 1992, against the Montreal Canadiens.

The Senators changed their ECHL affiliate after their former affiliate, the Evansville IceMen, went dormant for the season due to arena lease issues. On July 14, 2016, the Senators announced an affiliation agreement with the Wichita Thunder. On September 26, the Senators announced that they would move their American Hockey League (AHL) affiliate Binghamton Senators to Belleville, Ontario, for the 2017–18 season. The club was renamed the Belleville Senators.

Preseason
The Senators played a seven-game pre-season schedule. The schedule included two home games against the Montreal Canadiens and Buffalo Sabres, three road games against the Montreal Canadiens, Buffalo Sabres, and Winnipeg Jets, and two neutral-site games against the Toronto Maple Leafs with one taking place in Halifax, Nova Scotia and the other in Saskatoon, Saskatchewan.

Regular season
The Senators opened the regular season at home on Wednesday, October 12 against their provincial rivals, the Toronto Maple Leafs. The first away game of their schedule was Monday, October 17 in Detroit against the Red Wings. They will conclude their home schedule on Saturday, April 8 against the New York Rangers. Their last regular season game will take place a day later in Brooklyn, New York against the Islanders.

On December 29, 2016, before a game against the Detroit Red Wings, the Senators retired the #11 jersey of former player Daniel Alfredsson. On January 24, 2017, the Senators honoured Bryan Murray as the first member of their "Ring of Honour" at the Canadian Tire Centre, before a game against the Washington Capitals. On January 25, 2017, the Senators announced a new team president Tom Anselmi, replacing founder Cyril Leeder who steps down as president of the team.

On March 17, 2017, the NHL announced that an outdoor game would be played at the TD Place Stadium in Ottawa on December 16, 2017. Known as the NHL 100 Classic, it is a regular-season game for the Senators and the Montreal Canadiens. This will commemorate the first NHL game, held in Ottawa on December 19, 1917, between the Senators and Canadiens. It is one of the events to commemorate the 100-year anniversary of the NHL and the 150-year anniversary of the founding of Canada. According to NHL president Gary Bettman: "To launch our next 100 years, we believe it is only right to bring the Canadiens and the Senators back together."

The attendance at home games dropped in 2016-17 according to ESPN. The Senators drew an average of 16,744 per game for a total of 686,534 for the season. This was 87% of capacity. In 2015–16, the Senators drew an average of 18,084 per game. The drop in attendance was noticed by the media, especially after games in the playoffs did not sell out. The drop, which was the third-largest in the league in the last ten years, was attributed to various factors, including a payroll systems issue for Government of Canada employees, lack of support for francophone fans, grumbling about the owner and other factors. Early in the season, the club fired persons in its marketing department, which led to at least one lawsuit.

Playoffs
On April 6, the Ottawa Senators qualified for the 2017 playoffs with a 2–1 shootout win over Boston Bruins. On April 8, the Ottawa Senators clinched home-ice advantage in the first round for the first time since 2007 after a 3–1 victory over the New York Rangers.

The Senators played the Boston Bruins in the first round. This was the first Ottawa–Boston series since the 1927 Stanley Cup Finals, the first for the contemporary Ottawa franchise versus the Bruins. The Senators defeated the Bruins four games to two and moved on to the second round.

The Senators faced the New York Rangers in the second round. This was the second postseason meeting in the last five years between the two teams. The New York Rangers won the series 4-3 back in 2012. The Senators defeated the Rangers four games to two and advanced to the Eastern Conference Final. This marks the third time in franchise history the Senators have made it to the third round, and the first time since 2007, when they advanced to the Stanley Cup Final after defeating the Buffalo Sabres in five games.

The Senators took on the Pittsburgh Penguins in the Eastern Conference Final. This marked the fourth time the two teams have met in a postseason series, with the Penguins taking three out of the four matchups. The Ottawa Senators are the only Canadian team to advance to the Conference Final in three different seasons in the last 20 years. The Senators would fall in seven games to the Penguins, with the seventh game being decided in double overtime. The Penguins would go on to defeat the Nashville Predators to win the Stanley Cup.

Standings

Schedule and results

Preseason

Regular season

Playoffs

Players

Statistics
Final Stats
Scoring

Goaltenders

†Denotes player spent time with another team before joining the Senators.  Stats reflect time with the Senators only.
‡No longer with team.
Bold denotes team leader in that category.

Awards

NHL awards

Records

Milestones

Transactions

Trades

Free agents acquired

Free agents lost

Claimed via waivers

Lost via waivers

Player signings

Draft picks

Below are the Ottawa Senators' selections at the 2016 NHL Entry Draft, held on June 24–25, 2016, at the First Niagara Center in Buffalo, New York.

Draft Notes
 The New Jersey Devils' first-round pick (#11 overall) went to the Ottawa Senators as a result of trade that was made on June 25, 2016 that sent Ottawa's first-round pick (#12 overall) and a conditional third-round pick (#80 overall) to the Devils.
 The Ottawa Senators' seventh-round pick went to the New York Islanders as part of a trade that saw Shane Prince being traded to the Islanders on February 29, 2016.

References

Ottawa Senators seasons
Ottawa Senators
2010s in Ottawa
Ottawa
2017 in Ontario